Thomas Bell (9 November 1906 – 1983) was an English professional footballer born in Seaham Harbour. He could play at inside right, centre forward and right half and was a regular goalscorer throughout his professional career.

Bell played for Dawdon Colliery before joining Bristol City. Unable to break into the City first team, Bell joined Torquay United late in 1925. He joined Merthyr Town in 1926. He subsequently played for Halifax Town, Chesterfield, Southport, Luton Town and Northampton Town before playing non-league football for Wellingborough Town and Spalding United.

References

1906 births
1983 deaths
Sportspeople from Seaham
Footballers from County Durham
English footballers
Association football forwards
Association football wing halves
Dawdon Colliery Welfare F.C. players
Bristol City F.C. players
Torquay United F.C. players
Merthyr Town F.C. players
Halifax Town A.F.C. players
Chesterfield F.C. players
Southport F.C. players
Luton Town F.C. players
Northampton Town F.C. players
Wellingborough Town F.C. players
Spalding United F.C. players
English Football League players